Our Lady of Fatima College is a Roman Catholic, all-girls, boarding high school in Borokiri, Port Harcourt, Rivers State. It is located within the Roman Catholic Diocese of Port Harcourt. The school was established on 7 November 1994 with just 60 students admitted into JSS1. They were later divided into two arms (A and B) of 30 students each. The first principal was Rev. Sr. Mary Francis Ikwenobe (EHJ). The current principal since 2017 is Rev. Sr. Rachel-Marie Okolorie (EHJ).

See also

 Education in Nigeria
 List of schools in Port Harcourt

References

External links

1994 establishments in Nigeria
Boarding schools in Rivers State
Educational institutions established in 1994
Girls' schools in Rivers State
Catholic boarding schools
Roman Catholic Diocese of Port Harcourt
Roman Catholic secondary schools in Nigeria
Schools in Port Harcourt
Secondary schools in Rivers State